The Mizoram College Teachers' Association (MCTA) is a governmental, non-political and non-profit organisation for college teachers under the Government of Mizoram, India. It was established by a conference of college teachers on 7 September 1979 at Aizawl, which became its headquarters. The organisation is recognised by the Government of Mizoram, and consists of 21 government colleges and 1 grant-in-aid college.

Membership is exclusively to those teachers working in the college or other higher education institute under the Government of Mizoram, and who were recruited under the norms of the University Grants Commission (India).

Aims and objectives

The aims and objectives of MCTA are:

to ensure quality education in Mizoram 
to cooperate with the government in the promotion of higher & technical Education
to safeguard and promote common interests of college teachers, and to inculcate among the teachers the spirit of cooperation.

Membership

MCTA opens membership to teachers of higher education under the Government of Mizoram, but only those appointed according to the norms of UGC. Enrolment requires a fee of INR 100, and annual fee of INR 50. Membership ceases om death, retirement, transfer to other post, and failure to pay fee. Every member is also imposed to contribute a welfare fund of INR 100 and condolence fund of INR 300 annually.

Branches

Affiliated colleges of MCTA are called branch members, and include:
Government Aizawl College, Aizawl
Government Aizawl North College, Aizawl
Government Aizawl West College, Aizawl
Government Champhai College, Champhai
College of Teachers Education, Aizawl
Government Hnahthial College, Hnahthial
Government Hrangbana College, Aizawl
Government J. Buana College, Lunglei 
Government J. Thankima College, Aizawl
Government Johnson College, Aizawl
Kamalanagar College, Kalamanagar
Government Khawzawl College, Khawzawl
Government Kolasib College, Kolasib
Government Lawngtlai College, Lawngtlai
Lunglei Government College, Lunglei
Government Mamit College, Mamit
Government Saiha College, Saiha
Government Saitual College, Saitual
Government Serchhip College, Serchhip
Government T. Romana College, Aizawl
Government Zawlnuam College, Zawlnuam
Government Zirtiri Residential Science College, Aizawl

Membership to Mizoram University

MCTA represent the state government colleges to the Academic Council of Mizoram University, under which all member branches are affiliated. Currently, President Thanglura, Vice-President J.H. Zoremthanga, and General Secretary P.L. Ramliana are the representatives.

References

Non-profit organisations based in India
Education in Mizoram
Education trade unions
Organisations based in Mizoram
Educational organisations based in India
1979 establishments in Mizoram
Trade unions established in 1979